The 1989–90 B Group was the thirty-fourth season of the Bulgarian B Football Group, the second tier of the Bulgarian football league system. A total of 20 teams contested the league.

League table

Top scorers

External links 
 1989–90 Bulgarian B Group season

1989-90
Bul
2